John Max Madsen (born April 24, 1939) is a general authority of the Church of Jesus Christ of Latter-day Saints (LDS Church). He has been a general authority since 1992.

Madsen's father, Louis L. Madsen, was an employee of the US Department of Agriculture, at the time of his birth. When he was six his family moved to Logan, Utah where his father was a professor at and later present of Utah State University. Madsen was later raised in Pullman, Washington. He served as a missionary in the North Central State Mission from 1959-1961. He earned his bachelor's degree at Washington State University, majoring in zoology and minoring in chemistry. 

Madsen had planned to go to dental school but instead became a seminary teacher and spent much of his career with the Church Educational System (CES).  In 1968, Madsen was sent to England as the first seminary teacher to work there. For a time, Madsen served as a CES coordinator in England. He also served as an institute instructor and later as a religion professor at Brigham Young University (BYU). Madsen got both his master's and Ed.D. from BYU. Madsen was later an LDS Church employee, serving in the Melchizedek Priesthood Department and other administrative roles. He was among the contributors to the 1992 Encyclopedia of Mormonism.

Prior to his call as a general authority, Madsen served in the LDS Church as a regional representative and as president of the England Southwest Mission (1970 to 1973). He also served as a member of the Young Men General Board and as a stake mission president. In 1992, Madsen became a member of the Second Quorum of the Seventy. In 1997 he was transferred to the First Quorum of the Seventy.

As a general authority, Madsen's assignments included serving as president of the church's Mexico North Area, and in the presidency of the North America West, North America Northwest, Philippines, and Australia/New Zealand areas.  He also served in the general presidency of the church's Young Men organization, having also served as a member of the organization's general board earlier in his life.

Madsen was designated as an emeritus general authority at the church's October 2009 general conference.

Notes

References

External links
John M. Madsen: Latter-day Saint official profile
John M. Madsen: BYU Religious Studies Center

1939 births
20th-century Mormon missionaries
American Mormon missionaries in the United States
American expatriates in the United Kingdom
American general authorities (LDS Church)
Brigham Young University alumni
Brigham Young University faculty
Church Educational System instructors
Counselors in the General Presidency of the Young Men (organization)
Latter Day Saints from Utah
Latter Day Saints from Washington (state)
Latter Day Saints from Washington, D.C.
Living people
Members of the First Quorum of the Seventy (LDS Church)
Members of the Second Quorum of the Seventy (LDS Church)
Mission presidents (LDS Church)
People from Pullman, Washington
People from Washington, D.C.
Regional representatives of the Twelve
Washington State University alumni